Vespa tropica, the greater banded hornet, is a tropical species of hornet found in Southern Asia, New Guinea and west Africa, and which has recently been discovered to be an invasive species on the Pacific island of Guam. It is a predator of paper wasps and possesses a potent sting, which can cause extreme pain and swelling.

Description
The head is dark brown/red; the abdomen is black with a distinct yellow stripe which covers most of the second abdominal segment. However, there is some variation across its range and in Singapore and southeastern Asia, specimens are often completely black and larger in size, while in other regions such as Hong Kong, the head and flanks of the thorax are normally reddish. A third colour form is found in the Andamans and Nicobars, which has a reddish brown head and thorax and all the dorsal plates on each segment of the gastrum are orange except the first.

Distribution
Vespa tropica is distributed throughout southern Asia from Afghanistan to the Philippines, south to New Guinea, New Britain and the Torres Strait Islands but it has not been recorded in mainland Australia.

Invasive
In August 2016 Vespa tropica was found at two sites in Guam, and has since been deemed a permanent resident of the island's ecosystem, until a solution is found to exterminate them.

Biology

Vespa tropica are raiders of the nests of other wasp species and take captured larvae back to their own nest to feed to their larvae. They have been observed to catch honeybees quite frequently, and even dragonflies have been noted as prey. A worker of V. tropica has been recorded as capturing and killing an individual of Vespa bicolor and also raiding nests of other polister wasps such as Ropalidia marginata. Vespa tropica is associated with forests in the lowlands, up to  altitude. In the vicinity of human habitations it will nest under roofs, in attics and sheds. The nest is normally rhomboid or bowl-shaped and has an open bottom, whereas most aerial hornets' nest are completely sealed. The outer shell of the nest consists of distinct, broad layers and the nest is quite brittle. Occasionally nests are built within the crown of trees. Nest temperature is maintained at  until about the middle of October, when it trends towards ambient as the nest begins to die. Predation by V. tropica is one of the foremost causes of colony failure in Polistes chinensis in Japan. V. tropica may play a significant role in controlling Asian polistine populations. It can be a secretive species, preferring to fly close to cover and often high among the crowns of trees. V. tropica, V. ducalis, and V. philippinensis together form the sub-genus V. tropica group.

References

</ref>

External links
Vespa tropica
Greater banded Hornet

Vespidae
Hymenoptera of Asia
Hymenoptera of Oceania
Insects of Southeast Asia
Insects of Afghanistan
Insects of Borneo
Insects of Brunei
Insects of India
Insects of Indonesia
Insects of Malaysia
Insects of Pakistan
Insects of Papua New Guinea
Insects of Thailand
Insects described in 1758
Taxa named by Carl Linnaeus